One Sunday Morning is a 1926 American comedy film directed by Fatty Arbuckle.

Cast
 Lloyd Hamilton
 Estelle Bradley
 Stanley Blystone

See also
 Fatty Arbuckle filmography

References

External links

1926 films
Films directed by Roscoe Arbuckle
American silent short films
1926 short films
American black-and-white films
Silent American comedy films
American comedy short films
1926 comedy films
1920s American films
1920s English-language films